Slime & Reason is the sixth studio album of original material by Roots Manuva. It was released on 1 September 2008 on the Big Dada label.  Hip Hop Connection magazine named it Album Of The Year 2008.

A limited-edition version of the album included a bonus CD, entitled Slime & Version, consisting of dub mixes by Wrongtom.

In 2009 it was awarded a silver certification from the Independent Music Companies Association which indicated sales of at least 30,000 copies throughout Europe.

Critical reception
At Metacritic, which assigns a weighted average score out of 100 to reviews from mainstream critics, the album received an average score of 76% based on 16 reviews, indicating "generally favorable reviews".

Track listing

Charts

References

External links
 

2008 albums
Roots Manuva albums
Big Dada albums